Probable histidyl-tRNA synthetase, mitochondrial is an enzyme that in humans is encoded by the HARS2 gene.

Aminoacyl-tRNA synthetases are a class of enzymes that charge tRNAs with their cognate amino acids. The protein encoded by this gene is an enzyme belonging to the class II family of aminoacyl-tRNA synthetases. Functioning in the synthesis of histidyl-transfer RNA, the enzyme plays an accessory role in the regulation of protein biosynthesis. The gene is located in a head-to-head orientation with HARS on chromosome five, where the homologous genes share a bidirectional promoter.

References

Further reading